Events during the year 1949 in Northern Ireland.

Incumbents
 Governor - 	Earl Granville 
 Prime Minister - Basil Brooke

Events
17 April – At midnight 26 counties officially leave the British Commonwealth under terms of the Republic of Ireland Act 1948. A 21-gun salute on O'Connell Bridge, Dublin, ushers in the Republic of Ireland.
3 May – The Parliament of the United Kingdom passes the Ireland Act guaranteeing the position of Northern Ireland as part of the United Kingdom as long as a majority of its citizens want it to be. The government also recognises the existence of the Republic of Ireland.
10 May – An Oireachtas motion calls a "Protest Against Partition" because of the UK's Ireland Act provisions.
13 May – John A. Costello, Éamon de Valera, William Norton and Seán MacBride share a platform to protest the British government's attitude to the constitutional status of Northern Ireland.
25 May – The Princess Elizabeth and The Duke of Edinburgh receive the freedom of Belfast during a visit to the city.
8 November – Street names in any language other than English are prohibited by an Amendment to a Bill passed in the Senate of Northern Ireland.

Arts and literature
 Daniel O'Neill paints Place du Tertre and The Blue Skirt.

Sport

Football
Irish League
Winners: Linfield

Irish Cup
Winners: Derry City 1–0 Glentoran

Belfast Celtic withdrew from the Irish League at the end of a season which had seen crowd trouble at a match against Linfield five months earlier.

Golf
Fred Daly plays in the Ryder Cup.

Births
14 January – Donovan McClelland, Social Democratic and Labour Party politician.
25 January – Tom Paulin, poet and critic.
23 February – Christopher Harte, cricketer.
17 March – Pat Rice, footballer and football coach.
18 March – Alex Higgins, snooker player.
21 March – Pat Finucane, solicitor (killed by loyalist paramilitaries 1989).
1 April – Sammy Nelson, footballer.
8 April – Graham Crothers, cricketer.
6 August – Alan Campbell, Pentecostal pastor.
1 September – Alasdair McDonnell, Social Democratic and Labour Party MP and MLA.
6 September – Iris Robinson, Democratic Unionist Party MP for Strangford and member of the Northern Ireland Assembly.
18 September – Mo Mowlam, English-born 11th British Secretary of State for Northern Ireland (died 2005).
Full date unknown – David McKittrick, journalist and writer.

Deaths
2 March – Cecil Lowry-Corry, 6th Earl Belmore, High Sheriff and councillor (born 1873).
2 August – William Lyle, Ulster Unionist Party member of the House of Commons of Northern Ireland for Queen's University Belfast and medical practitioner (born 1871).
19 September – George Shiels, dramatist (born 1886).
6 October – Robert Wilson Lynd, writer (born 1879).

See also
1949 in Scotland
1949 in Wales

References